The United Kingdom participated in the Eurovision Song Contest 1960. The British Broadcasting Corporation (BBC) organised a national final, the Eurovision Song Contest British Final, to select the United Kingdom's entry for the contest. The United Kingdom was represented by the song "Looking High, High, High", performed by Bryan Johnson, and placed 2nd, the United Kingdom's joint best placing in the competition at the time.

Background

Before Eurovision

Eurovision Song Contest British Final 

The Eurovision Song Contest British Final was the national final organised by the BBC to select the United Kingdom's entry for the contest. The selection consisted of two semi-finals held on 2 February and 4 February 1960, and a final held on 6 February 1960. All three shows were broadcast on BBC Television presented by David Jacobs.

The songs were evaluated by seven fifteen-member regional juries: the South of England, the Midlands, the North of England, Scotland, Wales, the West of England, and Northern Ireland.

Competing entries
Twelve songs were shortlisted by the BBC to compete in the selection. "When the Tide Turns" was performed by Rosemary Squires in the second semi-final, but performed by Pearl Carr & Teddy Johnson in the final.

Semi-final 1
The first semi-final was held on 2 February 1960 at 21:15 GMT. Six songs were performed, and the highlighted songs qualified for the final.

Semi-final 2
The second semi-final was held on 4 February 1960 at 21:20 GMT. Six songs were performed and the top four advanced to the final, due to there being a tie for first place. The highlighted songs qualified for the final.

Final
The final was held on 6 February 1960 at 21:30 GMT in the BBC TV Theatre in London. Seven songs were performed and "Looking High, High, High" was declared the winner.

At Eurovision
At the close of the voting, the United Kingdom had received 25 points, placing 2nd in a field of 13 entries.

Voting
Each country had a jury of ten people. Each juror awarded one point to their favourite song.

References

1960
Countries in the Eurovision Song Contest 1960
Eurovision
Eurovision